Alex Adrian Molinaroli (born October 7, 1959) is an American businessman who served as Chief Executive Officer (CEO) of Johnson Controls, from 2013 through 2017. Johnson Controls is a Fortune 80 diversified company with 130,000 employees in 1,300 locations worldwide.

Early life and education
Molinaroli was born October 7, 1959, in Parkersburg, WV. At an early age his family relocated to Charleston, SC for his father’s work.  

He attended primary and secondary parochial schools and graduated from Bishop England High School in 1978. 

He received a NROTC Scholarship to attend the University of South Carolina in Columbia, SC and was accepted into the school’s prestigious Honors College. He earned his Bachelor of Science in Electrical and Computer Engineering in 1983    

Later in life he continued his formal education while still working, earning a Master of Science in Business (MBA) from Northwestern University in Evanston, IL.

Career 

Molinaroli went to work for Johnson Controls in 1983. He held increasing levels of responsibility for controls systems and services sales and operations, and was Vice President and General Manager for North America Systems and General Manager for the Middle East businesses for Building Efficiency Division.   

In January of 2007, Molinaroli served as President of Johnson Controls Power Solutions Battery. As president of Power Solutions, he oversaw a renaissance within the company’s battery business. During this timeframe the profitability and topline growth dramatically improved – driven by investments in China, the development of advanced battery technologies and vertical integration into battery recycling and separator technologies.  

In January 2013, Molinaroli transitioned to the Johnson Controls corporate office as Vice Chairman and subsequently replaced Steve Roell as Chairman and CEO. 

As CEO of Johnson Controls, Alex Molinaroli led the company through significant transformation that continues today. In 2016, Johnson Controls International plc was formed through a merger with Tyco International.

Molinaroli retired from Johnson Controls in September 2017.

Other 
Molinaroli is a former board member of Johnson Controls International, The National Center for the Arts and Technology, The Electrification Coalition, Interstate Battery, Battery Council International, Milwaukee School of Engineering, Greater Milwaukee Committee and Greater Milwaukee and Waukesha County United Way (serving as Co-Campaign Chair in 2015-2016).  

Currently Molinaroli is engaged in early stage investments and serves as an executive advisor for various startup and technology companies.

Alex is married to Kristin Molinaroli and has three adult children. He currently resides in Marathon, FL.

References

External links 
 Biography at Johnson Controls

Living people
1959 births
Kellogg School of Management alumni
University of South Carolina alumni
American chief executives of Fortune 500 companies
Johnson Controls